Buriram Hospital is the main hospital of Buriram Province, Thailand and is classified under the Ministry of Public Health as a regional hospital. It has a CPIRD Medical Education Center which trains doctors for the Institute of Medicine of Suranaree University of Technology and is an affiliated hospital of the Faculty of Medicine Ramathibodi Hospital, Mahidol University.

History 
Buriram Hospital was first constructed in 1951 as one building with a capacity of 25 beds. It was officially opened on 10 March 1953. On 29 April 1997, the hospital became classified as a regional hospital and expanded to 520 beds. At the end of fiscal year 2000, the number of beds expanded to 590 and today the hospital has up to 895 beds in total.

See also 

Healthcare in Thailand
 Hospitals in Thailand
 List of hospitals in Thailand

References 

Hospitals in Thailand
Buriram province